George Inglis may refer to:

 George Inglis (footballer), footballer for Southampton St. Mary's F.C.
 George Henry Inglis (1902–1979), British Army officer